Gurvinder Singh Malhotra (born 19 June 1991) is an Indian professional wrestler better known by the ring name Dilsher Shanky. He is currently signed to WWE, where he performs on the SmackDown brand under the ring name Shanky. He is also known for his tenure in Continental Wrestling Entertainment (CWE).

Early life
Gurvinder was born to Sardar Narendra Singh and Narendra Kaur in 1991 in Jagadhri, Haryana, India. He saw The Great Khali talking about his new academy, Continental Wrestling Entertainment and decided to join CWE in 2015.

Personal life
Malhotra is a Khatri.

Professional wrestling career 

At the age of 24, Malhotra joined Continental Wrestling Entertainment (CWE) in 2015.  He was officially announced as a CWE Superstar named Shanky Singh on 21 June 2016 through the official YouTube channel of CWE. On 22 March 2017, he announced that he was being selected for the WWE tryouts in Dubai, United Arab Emirates. During his time in CWE, he won the Heavyweight title twice.

On 29 January 2020, WWE announced the signings of three Indian trainees, including Malhotra. At Superstar Spectacle on 22 January 2021, Malhotra, under the ring name Dilsher Shanky, teamed with Giant Zanjeer, Rey Mysterio, and Ricochet to defeat Cesaro, Dolph Ziggler, King Corbin, and Shinsuke Nakamura in an eight-man tag-team match. On 10 May episode of Raw, Shanky, along with Veer, would align themselves with Jinder Mahal. As part of the 2021 Draft, both Shanky and Mahal were drafted to the SmackDown brand while Veer remained on the Raw brand, ending their alliance with Veer.

Beginning on the 27 May episode of SmackDown, Shanky began dancing before and after his matches, possibly teasing a face turn. Shanky has been unseen on WWE programming since July, when Triple H took over creative.

Championship and accomplishments
Continental Wrestling Entertainment
CWE Heavyweight Championship (2 times)

Other media
Malhotra played the role of Zalzala Singh in the 2019 film,Bharat.

Filmography

Film

References

External links
 
 
 
 

Indian professional wrestlers
1991 births
Living people
People from Yamunanagar district
Indian male professional wrestlers
Professional wrestling in India
21st-century professional wrestlers